SM U-152 was a German Type U 151 submarine of the Imperial German Navy during World War I.

Built at Hamburg, the submarine was commissioned in October 1917. Initially intended as a submersible merchantman for transporting critical war materiel through the British blockade, she was converted to a combat ship while under construction.

Service history
U-152 was actively employed in the Atlantic during the last year of the conflict. Among her victims were two American schooners, Julia Frances (sunk on 27 January 1918) and A.E. Whyland (sunk on 13 March 1918), the Norwegian barque Stifinder (boarded and scuttled on 13 October 1918), the Spanish Giralda (sunk on 25 January 1918), and the U.S. Navy cargo ship . The latter was sunk, after a two-hour gun battle, with heavy casualties among her crew and passengers, on 30 September 1918. The previous day, 29 September, the submarine had also fought a gun battle with the Navy oiler , but despite being badly damaged the American ship escaped.

After returning to Germany in November 1918, at the end of her final wartime cruise, U-152 was surrendered to the Allies at Harwich on 24 November 1918 in accordance with the requirements of the Armistice with Germany. She was exhibited at Tower Bridge in London in December 1918, and then laid up at Portsmouth. On 30 June 1921, she was towed out into the English Channel and scuttled.

Summary of raiding history

Gallery

Notes

References

Bibliography 

Bodo Herzog/Günter Schomaekers: Ritter der Tiefe – Die erfolgreichsten U-Bootkommandanten der Welt. Verlag Welsermühl, Wels und München 1976, 

Paul Kemp: Die deutschen und österreichischen U-Boot Verluste in beiden Weltkriegen. Urbes Verlag Hans Jürgen Hansen, Gräfelfing vor München 1998, 
 Eberhard Möller / Werner Brack: Enzyklopädie deutscher U-Boote, Von 1904 bis zur Gegenwart, Motorbuch Verlag,

External links
 Naval Historical Center Online Library of Selected Images: U-152

World War I submarines of Germany
German Type U 151 submarines
1917 ships
Ships built in Hamburg
U-boats commissioned in 1917
U-boats sunk in 1921
Maritime incidents in 1921